Guard Me, My Talisman ("Krani menja, moj talisman", also known as Protect Me, My Talisman) is a 1986 Soviet drama film   directed by Roman Balayan. 
 
The film was entered into the main competition at the 43rd edition of the Venice Film Festival. It also won the Golden Tulip at the 1987 International Istanbul Film Festival.

Plot
The heroes of the film are modern young people - journalist Alexey Dmitriev, his wife, Tatyana, and some Klimov. A classic love triangle. Tatiana showing increased interest in Klimov, skillfully playing the role of an amateur of poetry.

As a spiritless person, Klimov intrudes into family life of Alexey offending and humiliating. In order to defend the honor and dignity, Alexey calls Klimov on a duel.

Cast 
Oleg Yankovskiy as Alexey Petrovich Dmitriev  
 Alexander Abdulov  as  Anatoli   Klimov 
 Tatyana Drubich  as  Tanya  
 Aleksandr Zbruyev  as  Dmitry,  director of the museum
 Alexander Adabashyan as Monsieur Dardye, a French tourist

References

External links

   

1986 drama films
1986 films
Films directed by Roman Balayan
Russian drama films